The Tête Ronde is a mountain of the Bernese Alps, located in the canton of Vaud, near the summit of the Diablerets massif of which it is a part. With an elevation of 3,037 metres above sea level, the Tête Ronde is the highest summit entirely within the canton of Vaud. Within the Diablerets massif, two summits that form part of the canton's border, the Diableret summit directly to the east and Oldenhorn peak, a short distance to the northeast, are both higher than the Tête Ronde.

References

External links
Tête Ronde on Hikr

Mountains of the Alps
Alpine three-thousanders
Mountains of Switzerland
Mountains of the canton of Vaud